The 2017 Mid-American Conference men's soccer tournament will be the 24th edition of the tournament. It will determine the Mid-American Conference's automatic berth into the 2017 NCAA Division I Men's Soccer Championship. The tournament will be held November 10 & 12 on the campus of Western Michigan University, the regular season champion.

Qualification 

The top four teams in the Mid-American Conference based on their conference regular season records qualified for the tournament.

Bracket

Schedule

Semifinals

MAC Championship

Statistical leaders

Top goalscorers

Tournament Best XI

See also 
 Mid-American Conference Men's Soccer Tournament
 2017 Mid-American Conference men's soccer season
 2017 NCAA Division I men's soccer season
 2017 NCAA Division I Men's Soccer Championship

References 

tournament 2017